Øyvind Hegg-Lunde (born 12 February 1982 in Lærdal, Norway) is a Norwegian drummer and composer, raised in Borgund, Lærdal, but today resides in Bergen. He is known from collaborations with José Gonzalez, Junip, Arve Henriksen, Ståle Storløkken, Frode Haltli, Trygve Seim, Per Jørgensen, Terje Isungset, Håkon Kornstad, Kurt Johannessen, Stein Urheim, The Megaphonic Thrift, Odin Staveland, Odd Martin Skålnes, Erlend O. Nødtvedt, Nils Petter Molvær, Eivind Aarset and Marilyn Mazur.

Career 

Hegg-Lunde holds a Master's degree in jazz/improvised music at Griegakademiet and the Högskolan för scen och musik in Gothenburg. He is active in several separate projects, like Building Instrument, Erlend Apneseth Trio, Strings & Timpani, Electric Eye, BERG, Crab is Crap, Glow, Krachmacher, The Big Almost, PSST, Oliva/Abbuehl/Hegg-Lunde, Susanne Abbuehl.

Since 2001 he has toured clubs and festivals in Norway and Scandinavia, as well as Europe, America, Africa. He has collaborated with other art forms such as dance, poetry, theater, performance art and VJs. He has received various scholarships and awards, including Nattjazz sin Vitalpris.

Together with co-composer Stephan Meidell, Hegg-Lunde got brilliant reviews for his commissioned opening concert Voice & Strings & Timpani for the 2016 Nattjazz. It was presented with musicians like Mari Kvien Brunvoll, Eva Pfitzenmaier, Kim Åge Furuhaug, and Stein Urheim.

Hegg-Lunde has written commission work for among others Henie Onstad Kunstsenter, Ultimafestivalen, Nattjazz, Førdefestivalen, Bajazzfestivalen, Dance Company FRIKAR, Borealisfestivalen.

Honors 

2007: Vital/Nattjazz talent award
2010, 2014, 2017 and 2020: Art Grant - Bergen Kommune
2012: Art Grant - Hordaland Fylkeskommune
2016: Winner of Folkelarmprisen for the album Det Andre Rommet with Erlend Apneseth Trio
2016: Nominated for Norwegian Grammy for the album Det Andre Rommet with Erlend Apneseth Trio
2017: Winner of Grand Prix du Disque (Jazz) and Coup de Coeur in France, for the album Princess,  with Stephan Oliva and Susanne Abbuehl
2017: Nominated for Norwegian Grammy for the album Åra with Erlend Apneseth Trio
2019: Winner of the Norwegian Grammy for the album Salika, Molika with Erlend Apneseth Trio 
2020: Nominated to the Nordic Music Prize for the album Salika, Molika with Erlend Apneseth Trio
2021: Winner of the EDVARD-prize for the album Voice & Strings & Timpani
2021: Received the Vossajazz-prize
2021: Working grant - Bergen Kommune

Discography 

 With 'Klangkameratane'
 2007: Mess Is More (Øyvind Jazzforum)

 With 'Jacon'
 2009: 2009 (Gallop)

 With Stein Urheim
 2009: Three Sets Of Music (Soundlet)

 With 'Defekt'
 2010: Pete's Game Machine (Eclipse)

 With Sarah Riedel
 2010: Memories Of A Lost Lane

 With Jessica Sligter
 2012: Fear And The Framing (Hubro)
 With 'Krachmacher'
 2012: Paratrooper (Playdate Records)

 With 'The Sweetest Thrill'
 2012: Jewellery (Playdate Records)
 2014: Strings & Timpani (Klangkollektivet)

 With Erlend Apneseth
 2013: Blikkspor» (Heilo)

 With 'Glow'
 2013: Glow (Playdate Records)

 With 'Augur Ensemble'
 2013: The Daily Unknown (Bottom)

 With 'Electric Eye'
 2013: Pick-Up, Lift-Off, Space, Time (Klangkollektivet)
 2016: Different Sun (Jansen Plateproduksjon)
 2016: «Live at Blå» (Jansen Plateproduksjoner)
 2017: «From The Poisonous Tree» (Jansen Plateproduksjoner)
 2021: "Horizons" (Fuzz Club)

 With 'The Big Almost'
2014: Mouth (Klangkollektivet)

 With 'Building Instrument'
 2014: Building Instrument (Hubro)
 2016: Kem Som Kan Å Leve (Hubro)
 2018: «Mangelen Min» (Hubro)

 With 'Crab is Crap' feat. Ståle Storløkken
 2015: Miradouro (Øyvind Jazzforum)

 With Erlend Apneseth Trio
 2016: Det Andre Rommet (Hubro)
 2017: «Åra» (Hubro)
 2019: «Salika, Molika» (Hubro)
 2021: "Lokk" (Hubro)

With 'Strings & Timpani'
 2016: Hyphen'' (Hubro)
 2017: «Brak 20» w/Mari Kvien Brunvoll (EDDA Music)
 2020: "Voice & Strings & Timpani" (Hubro)

With 'Fri Steel'
 2021: "Fristil" (Eget Selskap)

With 'Wendra Hill'
 2021: "Ungdomskilden" (Playdate Records)

With 'BERG'
 2020: «Berg» (ANUK)

With 'Jacob Öhrvall'
 2019: "Long Gone" (Killing Music)

With 'Fredrik William Olsen'
 2017: «Kosmos og Kaos» (Grappa)

With 'Oliva/Abbuehl/Hegg-Lunde'
 2017: «Princess» (Vision Fugitive)

References

External links 
 
 Junip
 Hubro
 Klangkollektivet
 Building Instrument
 Electric Eye

21st-century Norwegian drummers
Norwegian jazz drummers
Male drummers
Norwegian percussionists
Grieg Academy alumni
University of Bergen alumni
Norwegian composers
Norwegian male composers
1982 births
Living people
People from Lærdal
21st-century Norwegian male musicians
Male jazz musicians